Joakim Hillding (born May 30, 1988) is a Swedish professional ice hockey player. He is currently playing with Troja-Ljungby in the HockeyAllsvenskan (Allsv).

Playing career
After four seasons in the SHL with Färjestad BK, Hillding left as a free agent to sign a two-year contract in a return to former club, the Växjö Lakers, with whom he played during their tenure in the HockeyAllsvenskan on April 28, 2015.

Hillding played the 2018–19 season, helping IK Oskarshamn gain promotion to the SHL for the first time in their history. He posted 29 points in 49 games, and notched 12 points in 12 as a large contributor in their qualification games.

As a free agent, Hillding opted not to continue with Oskarshamn, accepting a one-year contract to play in Austria with the Graz 99ers of the EBEL on 2 July 2019.

References

External links

1988 births
Living people
Färjestad BK players
Graz 99ers players
HV71 players
Luleå HF players
Lukko players
IK Oskarshamn players
Stjernen Hockey players
Swedish ice hockey centres
Tingsryds AIF players
Växjö Lakers players
People from Ängelholm Municipality
21st-century Swedish people